James Colbrand  (bef. 1544 – 1600), of Chichester, Sussex, was an English politician.

He was a Member (MP) of the Parliament of England for Ludgershall in 1571 and 1572 and for Appleby 1597.

References

1600 deaths
English MPs 1571
People from Chichester
Year of birth uncertain
English MPs 1597–1598
English MPs 1572–1583